Samiu Kuita Vaipulu (born 24 December 1952) is a Tongan politician and Cabinet Minister. He was the Tongan Deputy Prime Minister from 2010 to 2014 and is currently Minister for Trade and Economic Development.

Personal life

Vaipulu is from the island of Ovaka. He has worked as a tour operator and as a manager for the Shipping Corporation of Polynesia. He studied at the University of the South Pacific in 1989, graduating with a Diploma in Legal Studies. He continues to be involved in the tourism industry on his home island of Vava'u.

Political career

Vaipulu was first elected to Parliament in 1987. He lost his seat in the 1990 election, but regained it in 1993. he then served until 2002, when he lost his seat again, but re-entered Parliament at the 2005 election. He was re-elected for his sixth term in 2008. In Parliament Vaipulu served as Chairman of the Committee of the Whole House.

In November 2009, Vaipulu was appointed to Cabinet as Minister for Justice. Unlike previous Cabinet appointments, he was not forced to resign his seat, and continued to serve as a People's Representative. In February 2010, Vaipulu supported the whipping of petty criminals.

Vaipulu was re-elected in the 2010 election.  He was subsequently appointed Deputy Prime Minister, Minister of Justice and Minister for Transport and Works in the Cabinet of Lord Tuʻivakanō. On September 1, 2011, the Justice portfolio was reshuffled to Clive Edwards, with Vaipulu retaining the others.

In October 2011, he was one of twelve MPs to vote in favour of large increases to allowances for any MPs on sick leave overseas. He argued the circumstances for such allowances would be rare, and that it was therefore justifiable. The motion was carried, and Vaipulu asked whether it would be possible for the eight MPs who had voted against (in protest against MPs spending public money on themselves at a time of economic difficulty) to be deprived of the allowances in question. Fellow MP Sione Taione, among the eight in question, reportedly responded by "query[ing] what [Vaipulu] was on about".

After the 2014 election Vaipulu put himself forward as a candidate for Prime Minister, but was defeated by 15 votes to 11. In 2019 following the death of ʻAkilisi Pōhiva he was appointed to the cabinet of Pohiva Tuʻiʻonetoa as Minister for Trade and Economic Development. On 25 January 2021 he was appointed Minister of Justice and Prisons, replacing Sione Vuna Fa'otusia who had resigned in December 2020.

He was re-elected in the 2021 election. On 28 December 2021 he was appointed to the Cabinet of Siaosi Sovaleni as Minister for Justice and Prisons.

Honours
National honours
  Order of Queen Sālote Tupou III, Member (31 July 2008).

References

External links
 Profile at Parliament of Tonga.

Members of the Legislative Assembly of Tonga 
Deputy Prime Ministers of Tonga
Justice ministers of Tonga
Public works ministers of Tonga
Trade ministers of Tonga
Transport ministers of Tonga
Living people
University of the South Pacific alumni
1953 births
People from Vavaʻu
Members of the Order of Queen Sālote Tupou III
Independent politicians in Tonga